Kornhill is one of the 35 constituencies in the Eastern District.

The constituency returns one district councillor to the Eastern District Council, with an election every four years. The seat is currently held by Bonnie Leung Wing-man of the Civic Party.

Kornhill constituency is loosely based on Kornhill in Quarry Bay with estimated population of 14,528.

Councillors represented

Election results

2010s

2000s

1990s

Notes

References

Quarry Bay
Constituencies of Hong Kong
Constituencies of Eastern District Council
1991 establishments in Hong Kong
Constituencies established in 1991